Prundeni is a commune located in Vâlcea County, Oltenia, Romania. It is composed of four villages: Bărbuceni, Călina, Prundeni and Zăvideni.

References

Communes in Vâlcea County
Localities in Oltenia